District Council of Payneham refers to either of the following:
 City of Campbelltown, South Australia from 1854 to 1868
 City of Payneham, South Australia, from 1883 to 1945